Amphissa versicolor is a species of small sea snail in the family Columbellidae. It is native to the Eastern Pacific.

References

Columbellidae
Gastropods described in 1871